The Conference of Bishops of Slovakia (Konferencia biskupov Slovenska) (KBS), was established on 23 March 1993, and is composed of the Catholic Bishops Roman Catholic in the Slovak Republic. Slovak Greek Catholic (Byzantine Rite) are not members of the episcopal conference, congregating in a parallel Council of Hierarchs instead.

Function
The bishops gather together to clarify the form and manner of the apostolic activities in Slovakia. They gather and act in accordance with various Church laws which take into account local circumstances (cf. c. 447 and 449, § 1 CIC).

The conference is based on the law itself have legal personality (cf. c. 449, § 2 CIC).

The conference includes all diocesan bishops of the Slovak Republic and according to their rights on a par with the position, and coadjutor bishops, auxiliary bishops and other titular bishops who are in that territory or outside it perform a specific task entrusted to them the Apostolic See or the Episcopal Conference of the common good of the country (cf. c. 450, § 1 CIC).

Emeritus Bishops are not members of the Episcopal Conference of Slovakia, but may be invited as consultors of several plenary sessions and to be members of some episcopal commissions. The sessions and committees include: Plenary Session, the Permanent Council General Secretariat, Council for Economic Affairs and the Committee and the Conference Board provided for a defined purpose (cf. c. 451, CIC), according to the Statute of the Slovak Bishops' Conference adopted on 21 6th 2000, Art. 1 to 4.

The Conference of Bishops of Slovakia 

President: Metropolitan Archbishop Bernard Bober

Western Ecclesiastical province
 Stanislav Zvolenský - Metropolitan Archbishop of Bratislava
 Jozef Haľko - Auxiliary Bishop of Bratislava
 Ján Orosch - Archbishop of Trnava
 Viliam Judák - Diocesan Bishop of Nitra
 Peter Beňo - Auxiliary Bishop of Nitra
 Marián Chovanec - Diocesan Bishop of Banská Bystrica
 Tomáš Galis - Diocesan Bishop of Žilina

Eastern Ecclesiastical province
 Bernard Bober - Metropolitan Archbishop of Košice 
 Marek Forgáč - Auxiliary Bishop of Košice
 Stanislav Stolárik - Diocesan Bishop of Rožňava 
 Ján Kuboš -  Apostolic Administrator of Spiš

Military ordinariate
 František Rábek - Bishop of the Military Ordinariate

Non-member Slovak Bishops not members of the Conference
 Róbert Bezák, CSsR - Archbishop Emeritus of Trnava
 Dávid Tencer, OFMCap - Diocesan Bishop of Reykjavík
 Vladimír Fekete, SDB - Apostolic Prefect of Azerbaijan

References

 History section decade activity Slovak Bishops' Conference [online]. The Episcopal Conference of Slovakia, [cit. 2012-07-20]. 
 Apostolic administrator [online]. Archdiocese of Trnava, [cit. 2012-07-20].

External links
 http://www.kbs.sk/?cid=1117025772
 http://www.abu.sk/?show=118
 http://www.kbs.sk/

Slovak
Catholic Church in Slovakia